Visionaries: Small Solutions to Enormously Large Problems is an Australian television series of documentary films written and directed by Tony Gailey and Julian Russell. Each of the seven films examines the work of a living person who is a revolutionary thinker in their field. What the subjects have in common is a creative contribution to humanity that has the potential to elicit a paradigm shift. They either apply a pragmatic conceptual framework for addressing global socioeconomic problems, or a radical scientific model for understanding a system.

The Australian Broadcasting Corporation premiered Visionaries in 1989; Channel 4 in the United Kingdom began transmitting the series in the following year. The series was produced by 220 Productions with funding from Film Finance Corporation Australia.

The individual films have been published on VHS home video and, in some cases, DVD.

Episodes

References

External links
 
 Video clips from Midwives… Lullabies… and Mother Earth at Australian Screen

1989 Australian television series debuts
1993 Australian television series endings
Australian documentary television films
Documentary film series
English-language television shows